Slovakia competed at the 1998 Winter Olympics in Nagano, Japan.

Biathlon

Men

Women

Women's 4 × 7.5 km relay

 1 A penalty loop of 150 metres had to be skied per missed target.
 2 One minute added per missed target.

Cross-country skiing

Men

 1 Starting delay based on 10 km results. 
 C = Classical style, F = Freestyle

Men's 4 × 10 km relay

Women

 2 Starting delay based on 5 km results. 
 C = Classical style, F = Freestyle

Figure skating

Men

Ice hockey

Men's tournament

Preliminary round – group A
Top team (shaded) advanced to the first round.

Consolation round - 9th place match

Team roster
Peter Bondra
Zdeno Cíger
Jozef Daňo
Ivan Droppa
Oto Haščák
Branislav Jánoš
Stanislav Jasečko
Ľubomír Kolník
Roman Kontšek
Miroslav Mosnár
Igor Murín
Ján Pardavý
Róbert Petrovický
Vlastimil Plavucha
Peter Pucher
Karol Rusznyák
Ľubomír Sekeráš
Roman Stantien
Róbert Švehla
Ján Varholík
Ľubomír Višňovský
Head coach: Ján Štěrbák

Luge

Women

Ski jumping

Snowboarding

Women's giant slalom

References
Official Olympic Reports
 Olympic Winter Games 1998, full results by sports-reference.com

Nations at the 1998 Winter Olympics
1998
1998 in Slovak sport